Preben Gylche (30 January 1927 – 27 February 1945) was a member of the Danish resistance executed by the German occupying power and son of Karl Paul Kristian Gylche.

Biography 

Preben Gylche was born in Arnesvej 19, Brønshøj 30 January 1927 as the second child to police detective Karl Paul Kristian Gylche and wife Merry Kirsten née Petersen and baptized in Brønshøj church the third Sunday after Trinity the same year.

The family lived in their third floor apartment on Arnesvej 19 until 1934, where they had moved to Nordre Fasanvej 192.

In 1937 the family moved again, to Hillerødgade 92, Copenhagen with the father supporting the family as a police detective.

On 19 September 1944 the German occupation force began their deportation of the Danish police including Gylche's 54-year-old father who within two months died in Buchenwald concentration camp. This undoubtedly influenced Gylche's decision to engage in active resistance.

Gylche was wounded in a firefight and arrested by Gestapo on 8 February 1945 and a court martial subsequently sentenced him to death.

On 27 February 1945 Gylche and nine other resistance members were executed in Ryvangen.

After his death 

On 29 August Gylche and 105 other victims of the occupation were given a state funeral in the memorial park founded at the execution and burial site in Ryvangen where he was executed. Bishop Hans Fuglsang-Damgaard led the service with participation from the royal family, the government and representatives of the resistance movement.

Preben Gylche is named with four others who died in the resistance on a memorial plaque at one at school at Duevej 63, Frederiksberg and with six others at another school at Julius Thomsensgade 5, Frederiksberg.

References

External links 
 

1927 births
1945 deaths
People from Copenhagen
Danish resistance members
Danish people executed by Nazi Germany
Resistance members killed by Nazi Germany